The Missoula metropolitan statistical area is located in the west-central portion of the state, the 2020 United States Census put the MSA's population at 117,922, making it the 2nd largest metropolitan statistical area in Montana. July 1, 2011 Census estimates put the Missoula Metropolitan Area population at 110,138 making it the second Metropolitan area in Montana to surpass 100,000 people, behind Billings and ahead of Bozeman. 

It is the largest metropolitan area between Boise, Idaho, and  Calgary, Alberta, Canada, and between Coeur d'Alene, Idaho, and Billings, Montana.

Counties 
Missoula County, Montana

Communities

Places with more than 70,000 inhabitants 
 Missoula (principal city)

Places with 1,000 to 10,000 inhabitants 
 Bonner-West Riverside (Census-designated place)
 East Missoula (Census-designated place)
 Lolo (Census-designated places)
 Orchard Homes (Census-designated places)
 Seeley Lake (Census-designated place)

Places with 500 to 1,000 inhabitants 
 Clinton (Census-designated place)
 Frenchtown (Census-designated place)
 Wye (Census-designated place)

Unincorporated places 
 Condon (Unincorporated place)
 Lolo Hot Springs, Montana (Unincorporated place)

Ghost towns 
 Hell Gate
 Garnet

Demographics 
As of the census of 2000, there were 95,802 people, 38,439 households, and 23,140 families residing in the county. The population density was 37 people per square mile (14/km²). There were 41,319 housing units at an average density of 16 per square mile (6/km²). The racial makeup of the county was:

94.02% White
0.27% Black or African American
2.29% Native American
1.02% Asian
0.08% Pacific Islander
0.45% from other races
1.86% from two or more races.

Historical populations

See also 
 Montana census statistical areas

References 

Missoula County, Montana